Sandon railway station was a railway station opened by the North Staffordshire Railway to serve the village of Sandon, Staffordshire, England.

For some time it was called Sandon and Salt to avoid confusion with Salt and Sandon railway station opened by the Stafford and Uttoxeter Railway in 1867.

Although in a country area and in some distance from the village it served, the station building was in an ornate Jacobean style with ornate gable ends and, on the entrance side, a substantial Porte-cochère. This was for the convenience of Dudley Ryder, 2nd Earl of Harrowby, who was about to have a new Jacobethan country house built in nearby Sandon Park. There was a decorated timber awning and, on the opposite platform, a small but similarly elegant waiting-room.

The platforms and station buildings were built on the down, Stoke, side of the bridge of the present B5066 road, and at the other end was a long siding accessed from both running lines by trailing crossovers, with a short spur back to the station. To simplify shunting, authority had been given by the company managers to use a tow rope which was kept beneath the signal box. Further along the line was a private siding belonging to the Earl to service his gasworks which was also controlled by Sandon box.

It was a busy main line but few trains called at the station. Under the 1923 grouping it became part of the London Midland and Scottish Railway. By 1938 there were only two trains on weekdays and four on Saturdays. The LMS closed the station to passengers on 6 January 1947 and British Railways closed it to goods on 5 September 1955.

The station buildings gradually deteriorated until the Sandon Estate bought them in 1970. They were renovated in 1985 and are now a private home.

The line is still open as a diversion of the Trent Valley Line between Rugeley Trent Valley via Colwich Junction and Stone.

See also
Listed buildings in Sandon and Burston

References

Further reading

Disused railway stations in Staffordshire
Railway stations in Great Britain opened in 1849
Railway stations in Great Britain closed in 1947
Former North Staffordshire Railway stations
1849 establishments in England